The 1983 NSL Cup was the seventh season of the NSL Cup, which was the main national association football knockout cup competition in Australia. All 16 NSL teams from around Australia entered the competition.

Round of 16

Quarter finals

Semi finals

Final

First leg

Second leg

References

NSL Cup
1983 in Australian soccer
NSL Cup seasons